Shama is a 1946 (pre-partition) Bollywood film, directed by Sibtain Fazli, starring Mehtab, Chanda Bai, Sadat Ali and Ameen Banu in lead roles.

Music 

Ghulam Haider composed the music for the film for playback singers, Shamshad Begum, Hamida Banu, Zohra Ambala and G. M. Durrani. Shams Lucknavi, Ehsan Rizvi and Shewan Rizvi wrote the lyrics.

References

External links 

1946 films
1940s Urdu-language films
1940s Hindi-language films
Indian black-and-white films
Films scored by Ghulam Haider
Urdu-language Indian films